Boneh-ye Ati (also Romanized as Boneh-ye ‘Āţī; also known as ‘Āţī) is a village in Kheybar Rural District, Choghamish District, Dezful County, Khuzestan Province, Iran. At the 2006 census, its population was 182, in 33 families.

References 

Populated places in Dezful County